Moisés Francisco Dallazen (born 9 August 1990), or simply Moisés, is a Brazilian professional footballer who plays as a right back, but also occasionally as a defensive midfielder, for Pelotas.

Career

Juventude
Moisés began his career in the academy of Juventude. In 2011, he received his first chance in the first team squad of the club, having been part of the group that won the Copa FGF that year.
 In January 2012, he was loaned for Canoas to gain experience, where he remained until the end of the Campeonato Gaúcho. In the second half of that year, he was loaned again, this time to Brasil (PE). However, he played only one match and returned to Juventude. In 2013, he excelled in the dispute of Campeonato Gaúcho, which eventually attracting the attention of the Grêmio, who months before had already signed with other players of the Juventude. Thus, signed with the club from Porto Alegre in May that year.

Grêmio
Moisés arrived at the Grêmio as a promise to the right back, having made his debut on 6 July, a 1–1 away draw against Atlético-PR at Campeonato Brasileiro Série A. However, received few opportunities in 2013 and early 2014, having played only seven matches in all competitions. In July 2014, he was loaned to Goiás until the end of the year. He made his debut for Goiás on 27 July, in 2–1 home won against São Paulo, also at Campeonato Brasileiro Série A.

Career statistics

Honours

Club
Juventude
 Copa FGF: 2011

References

External links
 
 

1990 births
Living people
Sportspeople from Rio Grande do Sul
Brazilian footballers
Association football fullbacks
Esporte Clube Juventude players
Canoas Sport Club players
Grêmio Esportivo Brasil players
Grêmio Foot-Ball Porto Alegrense players
Goiás Esporte Clube players
Santa Cruz Futebol Clube players
Esporte Clube Democrata players
Luverdense Esporte Clube players
Cuiabá Esporte Clube players
Campeonato Brasileiro Série A players
Campeonato Brasileiro Série B players
Campeonato Brasileiro Série C players
Campeonato Brasileiro Série D players